Grand Principality of Great Kabarda or East Circassia was a historical country in the North Caucasus corresponding partly to the modern Kabardino-Balkaria. It had better political organization than its neighbors and existed as a political community from the fifteenth century until it came under Russian control in the early nineteenth century after the Russo-Circassian War.

Geography and peoples
The Kabardians are the eastern branch of the Circassian nation. To the north were the Nogai steppe nomads, vassals of the Crimean Khanate. To the west were the Abazins, the Besleney, another Circassian tribe. In the east the Kabardians were sometimes in contact with the Kumyks. The country's boundaries fluctuated, as did its political unity and degree of control over outlying areas. The core of Kabardia was Great Kabardia which extended from somewhat east of the north-flowing part of the Kuban River to somewhat east of the north-flowing part of the Terek River. To the east was Lesser Kabardia between the Terek and Sunzha Rivers in what is now Chechen country. According to the Russian historian V. I. Potto, in the eighteenth century the Kabardians were greatly admired and copied by their neighbors, such that the phrase "he dresses, or rides, like a Kabardian" was an expression of high praise. Yermolov said that the Kabardians were the best fighters in the Caucasus but in his day they were much weakened by plague.

History
Inal the Great, the King of Circassia from 1427 to 1453 who unified all Circassians into one state, divided Circassia into several provinces, Kabardia being one of them. After his death, Kabardia became independent.

Without a native tradition of written history, most of what is known about Kabardian history comes from their contacts with neighbors. When the Golden Horde broke up about 1500 the steppe nomads became organized as the Nogai Horde. They and the Crimeans began or continued to raid the north Caucasus. Richmond reports raids for the years : ‘no later than 1476’, 1491, 1498, circa 1500 ‘every spring’,  1521, 1518, a 10-year break after 1519, 1539, 1547, 1554, 1567, 1578, 1606-1635 “seven times’, 1670s, 1708, 1720, 1735, 1740s, 1760–61 and  1777.

A brief alliance around 1560: Since the Crimeans were also raiding Russia (see Crimean–Nogai raids into East Slavic lands) the two peoples were natural allies. There had been an isolated group of Cossacks on the lower Terek from perhaps 1520. In 1552 a Kabardian embassy reached Moscow. In 1556 Kabardians and Cossacks took the Turkish fort Temryuk on the Taman peninsula. When Astrakhan was captured in 1556 Russia had a base 250 miles northeast of Kabardia. A few Kabardians entered Russian service. Temryuk came to power some time before 1558 and in 1561 his daughter married Ivan the Terrible. In 1567 Russia founded Sunzha Ostrog at the junction of the Terek and Sunzha in Lesser Kabardia. In 1569, after the Turks failed to take Astrakhan, their retreating troops were killed by the Kabardians. In 1570 Temryuk was killed fighting the Crimeans.  In 1588 there was another treaty of alliance.  With the death of Temryuk and losses in the Livonian War Russia disengaged from the Caucasus for about 200 years. Sunzha Ostrog was abandoned in 1571, rebuilt in 1578 and abandoned a year later.

1600–1753: In 1645 a regiment was moved to Tersk (it has been re-established early in the century). Kabardia split into two factions, the pro-Russian Baksan and pro-Crimean Kashkatau (originally the alliances were opposite, but they switched sides some time after 1722.). One side brought in Russians from Astrakhan.  The Nekrasov Cossacks settled on the Kuban about 1711. More Cossacks settled on the Terek and Kizlyar was founded in 1736.  In 1739 Kabardia was declared a buffer state between the Russian and Ottoman empires. In 1744 Koltsov and 400 Cossacks arrived to support the Baksan faction. Another force was sent in 1753.

Conquest: Kabardia came under Russian control between about 1769 and 1830. They moved west from the Terek country, southwest from Astrakhan and to a lesser degree southeast from Azov. From 1769 Russia intervened in Georgia south of the mountains. This required them to hold the Georgian Military Highway which passed through Kabardia. Georgia was annexed in 1800.

Mozdok was established in 1763 and in 1769 Russia attacked Kabardia for the first time. The 1774 Treaty of Küçük Kaynarca declared Kabardia a vassal of the Crimean Khanate. In 1777 the Mozdok line was begun which was to run from Mozdok northwest to Azov. From 1779 a line of forts was run west along the Malka River, cutting off Kabardian pastures. In 1779 von Shtrandman was sent to the north Caucasus and fought 1500 Kabardians at a place called Fort Pavolosk. There was a major battle on the Malka River and later 3000 Kabardians were defeated in the Baksan country. This led to a treaty but there was more fighting in 1780. By 1783 the Georgian Military Highway had been improved sufficiently to be used by wheeled traffic. In 1785-91 Sheikh Mansur attempted to lead an anti-Russian holy war in the north Caucasus. During the Russo-Turkish War (1787–92) Russian forces thrice crossed Circassian territory attempting to take the Black Sea fort of Anapa. Late in this war Batal Pasha invaded the north Caucasus and was defeated. In 1791 Ust-Labinsk was established in Circassia at the junction of the Kuban and Laba rivers. By 1793 25000 Cossacks were settled along the Mozdok line.

In the early nineteenth century a plague struck the north Caucasus which lasted until the 1830s. It is estimated that Kabardia lost 90% of its population, falling from 200,000 in 1790 to 30,000 in 1830.  In 1804 there was a general uprising all over the north Caucasus. The Russians won at least three battles mainly because of their artillery. One involved 13000 men on both sides and another involved 7000 Kabardians. Around 1810 Russia destroyed 200 villages. In 1822 new forts were built on the North Caucasus Line. In the 1820s Aleksey Petrovich Yermolov led a campaign which is said to have completely depopulated Lesser Kabardia. After about 1830 the Kabardians had been subdued by plague and war and the Russians turned their attention to the Murid War in the east and the Russo-Circassian War in the west.

Sources
Walter Richmond, The Northwest Caucasus, 2008

Former countries in Europe
Historical regions in Russia
History of the North Caucasus
Kabardino-Balkaria
Historical regions
Vassal states of the Ottoman Empire